BBS Kraftfahrzeugtechnik AG (English: BBS Automotive Technology AG) is a high-performance automobile wheel design company headquartered in Schiltach, Germany. BBS produces wheels for motorsport, OEM, and aftermarket applications. The company is often credited as pioneering the three-piece wheel and advancing the aluminum wheel industry over many decades, and remains one of the largest producers of automobile wheels in the world.

The company employs approximately 1,200 employees worldwide (2018). BBS trades on the Frankfurt Stock Exchange (Symbol: BKS3) with a market capitalization of €8.15M.

History 

BBS Kraftfahrzeugtechnik AG began in 1970 in Schiltach, Germany, by Heinrich Baumgartner and Klaus Brand as a manufacturing plant for plastic auto body parts. The initials BBS are based on the last names of the two founders and the city in which the company was founded (Baumgartner, Brand, Schiltach).

In 1972, BBS pioneered the development of a three-piece racing wheel, a revolution in motorsport design. This original wheel was called the BBS Mahle, named as such due to its partnership with Mahle for manufacturing. By 1975, BBS had developed the popular cross-spoke design and the counter pressure process. BBS entered into a technical cooperation agreement in 1990 with ASA, a Korean company that was starting wheel production. In 1993, BBS merged the gap between their three-piece forged wheel and one-piece cast wheel with the two-piece design found in the RSII, defining BBS as a pioneer in one-, two-, and three-piece wheels. BBS developed a magnesium forged wheel in 1994 for motorsports use, especially in Formula One, which was over 20% lighter than the standard cast aluminum wheels. In 1995, BBS developed the first one-piece flow-formed cast wheel, with the use of FEM analysis. The first hollow-spoke wheel was also developed by BBS, in collaboration with Porsche and Kuka, in 2000. Many of the design elements that BBS has developed and popularized over the years have gone on to be replicated in the automotive and aftermarket industry, such as stepped-lip barrels, Y-shaped spokes, colored center caps, and lug covers.

In May 1987, BBS had its initial public offering, and continues to be traded on the Frankfurt Stock Exchange.

In 2007, the primary country where BBS sourced aluminum from, Guinea, experienced political unrest which caused market prices for aluminum to increase dramatically. This significantly affected the company's business and revenue, leading to bankruptcy for BBS and being taken over by the Belgian firm Punch International. In July 2015, South Korean firm Nice Corp became the majority owner. In 2020, BBS automotive GmbH filed for insolvency, but was acquired by KW automotive GmbH in March 2021, a multinational automotive suspension parts company. In partnership with KW, BBS has since unveiled new partnerships and endeavors, such as BBS Unlimited, a way to customize and order countless configurations of wheels, rather than relying on only model-specific offerings.

Technology 
This process achieves an ideal material structure with high density and strength, which allows for lightweight and thin milling.

In modern times, BBS engineered the Air Inside Technology (AIT) in 2002, where hollow chambers are created within the wheel structure to compensate for the small air volume in modern ultra-low-profile tires, reduce unsprung weight, improve handling dynamics, and increase fuel efficiency without sacrificing strength and rigidity. This innovation earned BBS Kraftfahrzeugtechnik the Automechanika Innovation Award 2006 in the tuning segment.

BBS continues to produce one-, two-, and three-piece forged wheels out of aluminum and magnesium alloys, as well as high performance flow-formed wheels and low-pressure cast wheels. BBS also actively uses specialized quality and weight optimization methods, such as CNC back-milled spokes, x-ray inspection, FEM analysis, flow-forming, ceramic polishing, stainless steel lip bumpers, and heat treatment.

Motorsports 
BBS has a long history in the world of motorsport, having produced wheels for Formula One, the 24 Hours of Le Mans, IndyCar, DTM, NASCAR, World Touring Car Championship, and other racing series from as early as 1972. The company pioneered technologies in the production of racing wheels and in making wheels lighter and stronger for race usage.

Japanese company Washibeam Co., Ltd. manufactures the BBS F1 Magnesium wheel and all racing aluminum wheels. Since BBS is a customer of Washibeam, manufacture of the wheel will not be discontinued if BBS goes bankrupt.

In 2012, BBS Motorsport & Engineering GmbH, the racing division of BBS, became independent under the Japanese Ono Group (Washi Kosan) and moved to Haslach from Schiltach. Production of all BBS forged racing wheels continues in Japan.

The company is the largest supplier of wheels for IndyCar Series and the main supplier of Formula One teams. BBS has also supplied wheels for the NASCAR Cup Series starting in 2022, when the Next Gen car made its debut.

OEM applications 
BBS has and continues to supply OEM wheel applications to a number of automobile brands. In street vehicles, their products can be seen on brands such as BMW, Porsche, Mercedes-Benz, Audi, Ferrari, Maserati, Mitsubishi, Mazda, Rolls-Royce, Jaguar, Infiniti, Renault, Saab, Subaru, Volkswagen, Toyota, and Volvo. Lexus began using BBS wheels on its IS-F when launched in 2008, updating the design for the 2010 model year and again for 2012.

The RS cross-spoke design, which superficially resembles a wire wheel, was common on many European sports cars produced from the 1980s to the early 1990s. This design was noticeably lighter in weight compared to many other styles of the time.

Aftermarket 
With the popularization of BBS wheels in the 1970's by motorsports teams and luxury automobile manufacturers such as BMW and Porsche, the demand for BBS wheels in the aftermarket began to grow. The three-piece RS released in 1977 was one of the most popular BBS-produced wheels for automobile manufacturers, and soon after became a popular aftermarket wheel which was often replicated by other manufacturers. In 1987, BBS released their first one-piece forged wheel, the RG, based on the same wire-wheel design as the RS. In 1992, the RSII was released, their first two-piece wheel.

The market of BBS as an aftermarket wheel producer surged in 1983 with the inception of global sales by the company. Rather than selling primarily in Europe, or to OEMs and motorsports teams only, BBS broadened their scope to include sales in the Americas with the founding of BBS of America in 1983, in France with BBS France Co. S.A., and in Japan with BBS Japan Co. Ltd. with partner Washi Beam Co. These companies could then sell not only to their respective domestic automobile manufacturers and motorsports teams, but also to their general regional public.

References

External links 
 
 BBS promotional video showing manufacturing processes

Auto parts suppliers of Germany
Wheel manufacturers
Automotive motorsports and performance companies
Companies based in Baden-Württemberg
Companies listed on the Frankfurt Stock Exchange
German brands